The Irrigation Association is a trade association of about 1800 companies in the agriculture and landscape industries. It was established in 1949.

Certified irrigation designers with a specialty in sprinkler, surface or drip-micro qualify to become Technical Service Providers for U.S. Department of Agriculture (USDA) projects through the Natural Resources Conservation Service.

In September 2010, the Irrigation Association began offering computer-based testing for certification exams.

Smart Irrigation Month 
In 2010 the association named July "Smart Irrigation Month" in order to promote water conservation in that month. John Linder submitted a resolution to Congress in support of the initiative.

References

External links 
 Official web site

Irrigation
Trade associations